Lonchocarpus minimiflorus is a species of plant in the family Fabaceae. It is found in Costa Rica, El Salvador, Guatemala, Honduras, Mexico, and Nicaragua.

References

minimiflorus
Flora of Mexico
Flora of Central America
Endangered plants
Endangered biota of Mexico
Taxonomy articles created by Polbot